Ayrton Daryl Statie (born 22 July 1994) is a Bonairean professional footballer who plays as a left back for CHC Den Bosch.

Career

Club
Statie was released by Sabail FK at the end of the 2017–18 season.

International
Born in Bonaire, Statie received his first Curaçao national team call-up in May 2016. He debuted for Curaçao in a 7–0 2017 Caribbean Cup qualification win over U.S. Virgin Islands in June 2016.

Career statistics

Club

International

Statistics accurate as of match played 26 March 2018

Honours

International
Curaçao
 Caribbean Cup: 2017
 King's Cup: 2019

References

1994 births
Living people
Curaçao footballers
Curaçao international footballers
Bonaire footballers
Dutch footballers
FC Den Bosch players
FC Eindhoven players
TOP Oss players
Sabail FK players
FC Lienden players
Reno 1868 FC players
Eerste Divisie players
Tweede Divisie players
Azerbaijan Premier League players
2017 CONCACAF Gold Cup players
Association football fullbacks
2019 CONCACAF Gold Cup players
USL Championship players